The  Eastern League season began on approximately April 1 and the regular season ended on approximately September 1. 

The London Tigers defeated the New Britain Red Sox three games to zero to win the Eastern League Championship Series.

Regular season

Standings

Notes:
Green shade indicates that team advanced to the playoffs
Bold indicates that team advanced to ELCS
Italics indicates that team won ELCS

Playoffs

Semi-finals Series
London Tigers defeated the Canton–Akron Indians 3 games to 2.
New Britain Red Sox defeated the Albany/Colonie Yankees 3 games to 2.

Championship Series
London Tigers defeated the New Britain Red Sox 3 games to 0.

References

External links
1990 Eastern League Review at thebaseballcube.com

Eastern League seasons